The Border Troops Training Centre is located in the Rudaki District of the Districts of Republican Subordination in Tajikistan, used for training personnel of the Tajik Border Troops as of 2011.

References

Tajik Border Troops
Military education and training in Tajikistan